The Micronesian Games (or Micro Games, MicroGames) are a quadrennial international multi-sport event within the Micronesian region. The Games were first held in 1969 in Saipan (Northern Mariana Islands). The 2010 Micronesian Games were initially due to be held in Majuro (Marshall Islands), until the hosts withdrew. The 2010 Games were hosted by Palau. The Federated States of Micronesia won the bidding to host the 2014 Micronesian Games in Pohnpei State, and later won again against CNMI for the 2018 Micronesian Games to be held in Yap State.

History
After the inaugural 1969 edition, the Games were supposed to be a regular event. However, the second edition did not take place until 1990. Since then, the Games have been held every four years without fail.

All-time medal table

Editions

Competitors
Participants include four sovereign countries (the Marshall Islands, Kiribati, Nauru, and Palau), a commonwealth in political union with the United States (the Northern Mariana Islands), an organized unincorporated territory of the United States (Guam), and the four constituent States of the Federated States of Micronesia (Chuuk, Pohnpei, Kosrae and Yap, which compete separately from one another).

These ten countries, States and territories are all located within the Micronesian region of Oceania.

All participants also take part in the Pacific Games, although the Federated States of Micronesia competes as a unified country there.

Events
Athletes compete in the fields of athletics, baseball, basketball, beach volleyball, coconut tree climbing, coconut husking, fast pitch softball, association football, golf, slow pitch softball, spearfishing, swimming, table tennis, triathlon, va'a canoe, volleyball and wrestling, as well as the "micro all around".

The Micronesian Games thus combine events that may be found in other international competitions with events more specific to Micronesian countries. Coconut tree climbing and coconut husking appear to have been demonstration events at the 2006 Games: they are listed as events on the Games' official website, but are not listed on the results and medals' page.

See also
Pacific Games
Athletics at the Micronesian Games
Football at the Micronesian Games

References

External links

 
Multi-sport events in Oceania
Recurring sporting events established in 1969
1969 establishments in Oceania